Martin W. Bartnes (born 11 April 1978) is a Norwegian ski mountaineer and cross-country skier.

Bartnes was born in Levanger. In 2006, when he started ski mountaineering, he competed in his first race in Oppdal, and became a member of the national team. Together with Ola Berger, Ove-Erik Tronvoll and Ola Herje Hovdenak, he placed eighth in the relay event of the 2007 European Championship of Ski Mountaineering. He currently lives in Trondheim. His club is Steinkjer SK.

External links 
 Martin Bartnes at skimountaineering.org

References 

1978 births
Living people
Norwegian male ski mountaineers
Norwegian male cross-country skiers
People from Levanger
Sportspeople from Trøndelag